Jereh (also known as Gereh and Jireh) is a village in Jereh Rural District, Jereh and Baladeh District, Kazerun County, Fars Province, Iran. At the 2006 census, its population was 1,491, in 337 families.

References 

Populated places in Kazerun County